Kabutra (also known as Nat or Natra) is an endangered Indo-Aryan language spoken in Sindh, Pakistan.  Kabutra is almost identical to neighboring Sansi in India.  Kabutra is unwritten, but may be written with a variety of the Arabic script.

References 

Indo-Aryan languages